Amrit Lal Meena is an Indian politician who is an elected member from Salumber Assembly constituency in Udaipur district of Rajasthan. And he is a member of the Bharatiya Janata Party.

Controversy

In July 2021, Amrit Lal Meena was arrested in the case of a fake mark sheet.

References

1959 births
Living people
Rajasthan MLAs 2018–2023
People from Udaipur
Bharatiya Janata Party politicians from Rajasthan
Rajasthan MLAs 2013–2018